Fred Berger (born May 10, 1981) is an American film producer who was nominated for the Academy Award for Best Picture for the 2016 musical La La Land, for which he also won the 2016 Golden Globe Award for Best Motion Picture – Musical or Comedy and Producers Guild of America Award for Best Theatrical Motion Picture.

In addition to La La Land, Berger served as a producer on the films The Autopsy of Jane Doe and Taking Chance. , he is a partner at Automatik Entertainment alongside Brian Kavanaugh-Jones.

References

External links

1981 births
Living people
20th-century American Jews
Film producers from New York (state)
Businesspeople from New York City
Filmmakers who won the Best Film BAFTA Award
Primetime Emmy Award winners
Golden Globe Award-winning producers
21st-century American Jews